Bekir Karayel (born 10 May 1982 in Sungurlu, Çorum Province, Turkey) is a Turkish middle and long-distance runner, who later specialized in marathon. He studied at Gazi University.

In 2011, he won the first edition of Darıca Half Marathon in a time 1:05:08.

He qualified for participation in marathon event at the 2012 Summer Olympics and finished in 76th.

Personal best
800m - 1:58.55 (2004)
1500m - 4:00.33 (2003)
2000m - 5:20.74 (2003)
3000m - 8:47.49 (2003)
10000m - 30:00.88 (2011)
Half Marathon - 1:02:48 (2014)
Marathon - 2:13:21 (2012)

References

External links

1982 births
People from Sungurlu
Living people
Turkish male middle-distance runners
Turkish male long-distance runners
Turkish male marathon runners
Olympic athletes of Turkey
Athletes (track and field) at the 2012 Summer Olympics
Gazi University alumni
World Athletics Championships athletes for Turkey
Athletes (track and field) at the 2018 Mediterranean Games
Mediterranean Games competitors for Turkey
20th-century Turkish people
21st-century Turkish people